Gregg T. Alf (born 1957 in Los Angeles) is a prominent contemporary American violin maker based in Ann Arbor, Michigan.

Alf made his first violin in 1975. Later, he spent eight years in Cremona, Italy, where he graduated from the International Violin Making School and established a growing reputation for his work.

In 1984 Gregg returned to the United States, and together with Joseph Curtin, founded the violin-making studios of Curtin & Alf. His partnership with Joseph Curtin attracted the attention of numerous stars of the violin world, including Elmar Oliveira,  Ruggiero Ricci, and Zvi Zeitlin. In 1993 a Curtin and Alf violin made for Oliveira set a record at a Sotheby's auction for the highest price paid for a violin by a living maker. In 1997 he opened Alf Studios at the same location in Ann Arbor.

Replicas of classic Italian instruments formed the basis of his early work.  But, Gregg also uses science and technology to better understand the acoustical foundations of his craft. Since 1996 he has been a member and facilitator of the Oberlin Summer Violin Making Workshops. In recent years he has become a recognized expert on the acoustical properties of violins. He has also received numerous awards from the Violin Society of America for his work.

References

External links 
 

American musical instrument makers
American luthiers
Bowed string instrument makers
People from Ann Arbor, Michigan
Living people
1957 births